Old Common Council of Castropol, also Eo-Navia Land, Entrambasauguas or Honor de Suarón and Grandas is the name that was historically given to the sixteen westernmost villages of Asturias located between the Eo and Navia rivers. These villages belonged to the sixth sección or party (known as 'Episcopalias') that made up the Junta General del Principado, the historical governing body of Asturias. Episcopalías was composed by the following villages or concejos: Castropol, Rivera de Abajo, Rivera de Arriba, Langreo, Llanera, Quirós, Teverga, Noreña, Las Regueras, Navia, Morcín, Tudela, Proaza, Santo Adriano, Riosa, Olloniego, Yernes y Tameza, Bimenes, Paderni, Sobrescobio and Peñaflor.

During the Roman Empire, the villages belonged to the Lucensis Conventum parish, which was absorbed into the Asturias Kingdom after the territorial partition that followed the death of Alfonso III. During the second half of the 12th century, the region came under the direct influence of the bishopry of Oviedo as a result of an 1154 land grant by Fernando II of León. After its emancipation from the ecclesiastical authority, the Common Council of Castropol was admitted into the Junta General del Principado.

Despite a common history with Asturias, the region has many unique cultural and linguistic traits. The region has its own officially recognized language, Galician-Asturian, part of the Portuguese-Galician subgroup.

References

Asturias

eu:Eo-Navia
gl:Terra Eo-Navia